Channel 9 or TV 9 may refer to:

Television networks, channels and stations

Asia and Pacific
 Channel 39 (New Zealand TV channel), formerly Channel 9, a regional television station in Dunedin, New Zealand
 Channel 9 (Bangladeshi TV channel), a satellite TV channel from Bangladesh
 DZKB-TV, commonly known as Channel 9, the flagship television station of Radio Philippines Network in Manila, Philippines
 HTV9, an Ho Chi Minh City Television, Vietnam
 Modernine TV, formerly known as Thai TV Channel 4 and Channel 9 M.C.O.T.
 Nine Network, an Australian commercial television network commonly known as Channel 9
 TV9 Bharatvarsh, a Hindi language news channel
 TV9 Gujarati, a Gujarati language 24-hour news channel in Gujarat state
 TV9 Kannada, a 24-hour Kannada language news channel
 TV9 (Malaysian TV network), a free-to-air private television network in Malaysia
 TV9 Marathi, a 24-hour Marathi-language news channel
 TV9 Mongolia, a private television station in Mongolia
 TV9 Telugu, a Telugu news channel

Europe and Middle East
9Live, a German TV channel
C9TV, a local television station based in Derry, Northern Ireland, 1999–2012
Canal 9 (Danish TV channel), a Danish television channel owned by Discovery Networks
Canal 9 (Norwegian TV channel), a Norwegian television channel owned by TV4 Group and C More Entertainment
Canal Nou, in the Valencian Community, Spain
SBS 9, a commercial TV channel in the Netherlands
Channel 9 (Greece), a Greek television channel in the Attica region
Channel 9 (Israeli TV channel), formerly Israel Plus, a television station in Israel
Kanal 9, a commercial television channel in Sweden
Kanal 9 (Serbian TV channel), one of three regional television stations in Šumadija and Pomoravlje Region

South and Central America
ATV (Peruvian TV channel), formerly Canal 9, in Peru
Canal 9 (Costa Rican TV channel), a television station in Costa Rica 1994–2000
Canal 9 (Nicaraguan TV channel), a television channel in Nicaragua
Channel 9 (La Rioja, Argentina), a government television channel in the Provinces of La Rioja and Catamarca, Argentina
El Nueve or Azul Televisión, a general entertainment television network based in Buenos Aires, Argentina, formerly Canal 9
Sistema Nacional de Televisión (Paraguayan TV channel), formerly Canal 9, in Paraguay
Telefe Bahía Blanca, a private television channel  broadcasting on channel 9 in Bahía Blanca, Buenos Aires, Argentina

Other uses
Channel 9 (Microsoft), part of MSDN that publishes videos and podcasts on software development
Chanel 9, a fictional television channel on the BBC television series The Fast Show

See also
Citizens band radio channel 9 (27.065 MHz), reserved for emergency and distress calls
 Channel 9 branded TV stations in the United States
 Channel 9 virtual TV stations in Canada
 Channel 9 virtual TV stations in Mexico
 Channel 9 virtual TV stations in the United States
 Nine Regional (disambiguation)
 WIN Television, the current Nine Network regional affiliate since July 2021
 10 (Southern Cross Austereo), a former Nine Network regional affiliate which carried Nine Network programming from July 2016 to July 2021, and carried the Nine Regional name

For VHF frequencies covering 186-192 MHz:
 Channel 9 TV stations in Canada
 Channel 9 TV stations in Mexico
 Channel 9 digital TV stations in the United States
 Channel 9 low-power TV stations in the United States

09